Maurice Coomarawel (16 April 1940 – 22 July 2008) was a Sri Lankan cyclist. He competed in the individual road race at the 1960 Summer Olympics.

References

External links
 

1940 births
2008 deaths
Sri Lankan male cyclists
Olympic cyclists of Sri Lanka
Cyclists at the 1960 Summer Olympics
Sri Lankan emigrants to Australia
Place of birth missing